Alisson Abarca (born 25 January 1996 in San Salvador, El Salvador) is a Salvadoran model and beauty pageant titleholder who was crowned Miss Universe El Salvador 2017. She represented El Salvador at the Miss Universe 2017 pageant.

Pageantry

Miss Universe El Salvador 2017
Abarca was crowned Miss Universe El Salvador 2017 on July 7, 2017, and competed at Miss Universe 2017 but did not place. She was the subject of some controversy in El Salvador for having some plastic surgery after her national win and before the Miss Universe pageant.

Miss Universe 2017
As Miss Universe El Salvador, she competed at the Miss Universe 2017 pageant. She gave all her press junket interviews in English, which has not been common for prior representatives from the country.

Personal
Abarca was the valedictorian of her class in high school and speaks English fluently. Abarca is seeking a bachelor's degree in English and hopes to become an English teacher. Abarca was still a university student when she was crowned Miss Universe El Salvador in 2017.

She received both criticism and support for using cosmetic surgery, including breast enhancement, to improve her appearance in preparation for the Miss Universe pageant. Abarca says she is not ashamed.

During the Miss Universe pageant, Abarca dressed in an elaborate costume as "Goddess of the River Lempa." However, during her performance she tripped several times over the fake boat from her costume and couldn't finish the catwalk. Although it likely contributed to her loss, she received an outpouring of support from her fans.

Abarca enjoys soccer, softball, singing and belly dancing. She volunteers at a local orphanage and at her church. She is 1.65 meters (5'4") tall, and has been criticized as being too short for pageantry.

Further reading

References

External links
 www.nbelsalvador.com
 reinadodeelsalvador.com

1996 births
Living people
Miss Universe 2017 contestants
Salvadoran beauty pageant winners
People from San Salvador
Miss El Salvador winners